Network for Excellence in Health Innovation (NEHI), formerly New England Healthcare Institute is a member-based, non-partisan research and policy organization.

History
NEHI was founded in 2002 as the "New England Healthcare Institute" with 21 founding members. Today it has more than 80 member companies representing the different sectors of health care. In 2002, Wendy Everett became the organization’s president and Valerie Fleishman was hired as its executive director. Currently, NEHI has published more than 20 publications regarding innovative ways to improve health care nationally. Its first report, Economic Contributions of the Health Care Industry to New England, was published in 2003. In 2004, NEHI created and published two reports on innovative technologies to treat cancer and heart failure. In 2005, NEHI established a partnership with The Boston Foundation for “The Greater Boston Health Care Economy” project. In 2008, NEHI published the first reports ever to identify areas to reduce wasteful spending and inefficiencies in health care. In January, 2011 the organization officially dropped the acronym expansion referencing a regional affiliation and opened up offices in Washington, DC and San Francisco. NEHI has since made further efforts to garner national presence with a 2014 name expansion to NEHI (Network for Excellence in Health Innovation).

Founders
NEHI is led by Chief Executive Officer Wendy Everett, ScD, and Executive Director, Valerie Fleishman. It was founded by a group of high-profile health care leaders:
 Henri Termeer, then-CEO, Genzyme
 Joseph B. Martin, MD, PhD, then Dean of Harvard Medical School
 Sam Thier, MD, then CEO, Partners HealthCare
 Fred Telling, PhD, then VP of Corporate Policy and Strategic Management, Pfizer
 Charlie Baker, CEO, Harvard Pilgrim Health Care

Members
NEHI’s members include:

ABIOMED, Inc.
AdvaMed
Advanced ICU Care
Alkermes, Inc.
Alkeus Pharmaceuticals, Inc. 
American Associate of Colleges of Pharmacy 
American Cancer Society - New England
American Diabetes Association
American Osteopathic Association
Anthurium Solutions, Inc.
APCO Worldwide
Arthritis Foundation, New England Region
Association of American Medical Colleges
AstraZeneca Pharmaceuticals LP
Best Doctors
Biotechnology Industry Organization
Blue Cross Blue Shield Association
Blue Cross Blue Shield of Massachusetts
Boston Healthcare Associates
Bristol-Myers Squibb
California Healthcare Institute
Caregiver Action Network
Center for Applied Research
COPD Foundation
CVS Caremark
DePuy Mitek, Inc.
Dovetail Health
Eliza Corporation
EMC Corporation
EMD Serono, Inc.
Endo Pharmaceuticals
Ernst & Young, LLP
Fallon Community Health Plan
Foley Hoag, LLP
GlaxoSmithKline
The Goodyear Tire & Rubber Company
Greater Boston Chamber of Commerce
Harvard Pilgrim Health Care
The Healthcare Compliance Packaging Council 
Healthcare Institute of New Jersey
Hospital Corporation of America
Health Dialog Services Corporation
Joslin Diabetes Center
Kaiser Permanente
King & Spalding, LLP
Lockheed Martin Corporation
Malley & Franey Financial Group, Inc.
Massachusetts Biotechnology Council
Massachusetts Council of Community Hospitals
Massachusetts Life Sciences Center
Massachusetts Medical Society
Massachusetts Technology Collaborative
McKinsey & Company
Merck & Co., Inc.
MWV Healthcare
National Association of Chain Drug Stores Foundation
National Community Pharmacists Association
National Consumers League
National Family Caregivers Association
National Pharmaceutical Council
Network Health
New England Council
Novartis Vaccines & Diagnostics
Novo Nordisk, Inc.
Onyx Pharmaceuticals
Organogenesis Inc.
Oxford Bioscience Partners
PAREXEL International, Inc.
Partners HealthCare System
Philips Healthcare
PhRMA
PricewaterhouseCoopers LLP
Project HOPE
Sanofi
Scott & White Healthcare
Silverlink Communications, Inc.
Steward Health Care System, LLC
Tufts Center for the Study of Drug Development
Tufts Health Plan
Tufts University School of Medicine
UCLA Health System
UK Trade & Investment
University of Massachusetts Medical School
URAC
Verisk Health

References

Medical and health organizations based in Massachusetts